Alexey Konstantinovich Uzenyuk (born July 9, 1994), known professionally as Eldzhey, is a Russian rapper and songwriter best known for his hit singles "Розовое вино" (The Pink Wine), "Рваные джинсы" (The Ripped Jeans) and "360°".

Early life 
Alexey Uzenyuk was born on July 9, 1994 in Novosibirsk, Russia.

Career 

Uzenyuk began his career by songwriting in early 2010s. He published his first album, Бошки дымятся, in 2015, but really rose to fame in 2016 with his second album, Sayonara Boy, which charted well in Russian streaming platforms.

In 2017, Eldzhey and Feduk's single "Розовое вино" became one of the year's biggest hits in Russia, topping the streaming charts and gaining more than 200 million streams on VK.

In 2017, Eldzhey was the face on Yves Saint Laurent's La Nuit De L’homme Intense perfum line. The next year, he voice-acted in the Russian version of Disney's Ralph Breaks the Internet in the role of Spamley.

The arrival of success 
By the beginning of 2017, LJ's appearance is undergoing changes, and the rapper's new style is getting closer to the style of Zef and Die Antwoord. 

Back in October 2016 in a video interviewTo the TNT MUSIC channel, Aljay talked about what influenced his changes in music. On September 15, 2016, the first single "Disconnect" was presented on iTunes together with the performer Kravts. October 7, 2016 was released the album Sayonara Boy, which successfully debuted on the Russian Apple Music and iTunes charts, taking second place there. 

June 22, 2017 released his new album Sayonara Boy ろ, exclusively for the social network "VKontakte". The album was released on Apple Music and iTunes on June 24, 2017. The first single from the album was "FckuDJ", released on January 1, 2017. The second single was the track "Ripped Jeans", released on June 13, 2017: in a few days the track became the most popular on VKontakte and took the lead. Thus, by the end of 2017, LJ had six studio albums on his account, the last of which was Sayonara Boy ろ

Personal life 

Uzenyuk began dating Russian TV presenter Nastya Ivleeva in 2018, and they were married in 2019. In August 2021 the couple announced their divorce.

Discography

Albums 
 Бошки дымятся (2015)
 Катакомбы (2016)
 Sayonara Boy (2016)
 Sayonara Boy ろ (2017)
 Sayonara Boy X (2018)
 Sayonara Boy 143 (2018)
 Sayonara Boy Opal (2020)
 Sayonara bоль (2023)

References 

1994 births
Living people
Musicians from Novosibirsk
Russian rappers